The following table summarizes the history of foundings and relocations of the Jesuit Missions of Chiquitos.

See also
Chiquitano language#Historical subgroups
Jesuit Missions of Moxos

Notes

References

Spanish missions in Bolivia
Jesuit missions
Jesuit history in South America
Lists of populated places
Buildings and structures in Santa Cruz Department (Bolivia)
18th-century religious buildings and structures
18th century in the Viceroyalty of Peru
Tourist attractions in Santa Cruz Department (Bolivia)
World Heritage Sites in Bolivia